Arba Kokalari, (born 27 November 1986) is an Albanian-born Swedish politician of the Moderate Party who has been serving as a Member of the European Parliament since the 2019 European Parliament election in Sweden. 

In parliament Kokalari serves on the Committee on the Internal Market and Consumer Protection and the Committee on Women's Rights and Gender Equality. Since 2021 she has been her parliamentary group's shadow rapporteur on the Digital Services Act (DSA). 

In addition to her committee assignments, Kokalari is a member of the delegation for relations with the United States and the European Parliament Intergroup on LGBT Rights.

References

External links
Arba Kokalari - MUF

1986 births
Living people
Swedish people of Albanian descent
Politicians from Stockholm
Moderate Party MEPs
MEPs for Sweden 2019–2024
21st-century women MEPs for Sweden